Norwood Bowne (May 2, 1813 in New York City – January 7, 1890 in Delhi, Delaware County, New York) was an American newspaper editor and politician from New York.

Life
In early youth he learned the printer's trade. In 1830, he removed to Delhi, New York, to study law with Charles Hathaway, who had married Bowne's sister Maria Augusta in 1828, but worked for the Delaware Republican instead. This paper was not successful, and Bowne returned to New York City, where he published the Protestant Vindicator. In 1834, the printing and publishing house was destroyed by fire. In 1839, he returned to Delhi, New York, and from January 1839 until his death, he published the Delaware Express.

He was postmaster of Delhi, New York, from 1849 to 1852.

In 1854, he was elected an inspector of state prisons, being in office from 1855 to 1857.

In 1876, he ran for presidential elector on the Republican Rutherford B. Hayes ticket, but New York was won by Samuel J. Tilden.

Sources
The New York Civil List compiled by Franklin Benjamin Hough (pages 45 and 370; Weed, Parsons and Co., 1858)
The New York Civil List compiled by Franklin Benjamin Hough, Stephen C. Hutchins and Edgar Albert Werner (1867; pages 411 and 507)
THE REPUBLICAN NOMINATIONS in NYT on November 4, 1876
 History of Delaware County

1813 births
1890 deaths
People from Delhi, New York
New York State Prison Inspectors
19th-century American newspaper editors
New York (state) postmasters
American male journalists
New York (state) Republicans
19th-century male writers
Journalists from New York City